Robert Jack Stein (December 6, 1928 – July 31, 1980), known by his legalized stage name Bobby Van, was a musical actor and dancer, best known for his career on Broadway, in films and television from the 1950s through the 1970s. He was also a game show host and panelist.

Early life
Van was born to Jewish vaudeville parents in The Bronx, New York City, and grew up backstage, witnessing many memorable Depression-era acts. Originally, Van took King as his stage name (after his father's stage name, from the trio "Gordon, Reed and King"). He finally opted for Van, after seeing a Van Johnson poster hanging in his sister's bedroom. In a 1976 interview, Van said he had legalized his name change from 'Stein'.

Career
Van began his career as a musician, playing trumpet. When his band played a venue in the Catskills, Van was asked to fill in as a song and dance man for another act. His act drew rave reviews and gave Van a thrill performing live as a solo act. He went on to appear in several Broadway musicals.

In the early 1950s, Van received a contract with Metro-Goldwyn-Mayer and made several films there, including the title role in The Affairs of Dobie Gillis in 1953 and roles in the musicals Because You're Mine and Kiss Me, Kate. In 2010, reviewer Hal Erickson noted that "Van will always be remembered as the ecstatic young fellow who made like a human pogo stick during an expansive production number in Small Town Girl  (1953)."

In the 1960s, Van did comedy work with Mickey Rooney in films and television. He appeared in three episodes of Rooney's Mickey sitcom on ABC in the role of a freeloading brother-in-law. He also did some choreography, as had his father years earlier.

Van frequently appeared with his second wife, Elaine Joyce, on 1970s game shows such as Tattletales and Match Game. Van also hosted the game shows Showoffs, The Fun Factory, and Make Me Laugh.

Van starred in the 1971 Broadway revival of No, No, Nanette, for which he was nominated for a Tony Award. In 1973 he appeared in the musical remake of Lost Horizon, the last occasion on which he took his traditional song-and-dance persona to the big screen. His novelty dance number from Small Town Girl (1953) was featured in That's Entertainment, Part II (1976). In 1978, he played swindler Warren Custer in the episode "The Two-Million-Dollar Stowaway" of the NBC crime drama series The Eddie Capra Mysteries. In 1979, he appeared in the original Battlestar Galactica episode "Greetings from Earth" as the robot Hector, working alongside veteran song and dance man Ray Bolger (Vector).  Van also hosted a syndicated revival of the game show Make Me Laugh during the 1979–80 season.

In June 1977, Van appeared in the musical Anything Goes as Billy Crocker at the Kenley Players in Dayton, Ohio.

In August 1979, Van appeared in the musical Damn Yankees as Young Joe with the San Jose Civic Light Opera in San Jose, California. His co-star was Van Johnson. Bobby Van and wife Elaine Joyce appeared in a Love Boat episode titled "Gopher's Opportunity".

Personal life
A Democrat, Van supported Adlai Stevenson during the 1952 presidential election.

Van married starlet Diane Garrett in September 1952, though the marriage was kept secret until January 1953.

Van and Garrett attempted to have children for several years and, after losing a baby in 1956, they adopted a son in 1961 named Peter, nine months after taking him in as a five-day-old baby.

In 1959, both Van and Garrett were injured when their car was rear-ended, and sued the other driver, seeking $107,000. Garrett said she was unable to move for three weeks after the accident; both she and Van claimed back injury. Van was awarded $1,500 and Garrett was awarded $5,000. Judy Garland, who was a passenger in the Vans' vehicle, testified in court for them.

The couple separated in January 1964 and a divorce was final on September 27, 1966, despite rumors of an early reconsideration and a reconciliation in July 1964. Van had returned to town as his son was undergoing emergency hip surgery, not to reconcile. In November 1964, Walter Winchell wrote in his column that Van "(recently divorced after a dozen years) hopes to persuade actress Emmaline Henry to be his new spouse."

Van married Broadway actress Elaine Joyce in 1968. Their marriage reportedly ran a difficult course – an announcement was made on October 30, 1967, that they had wed, but they had not. In November, a blurb in a Hollywood column said that Van said he and Joyce planned to marry on December 2, 1967, but her brother, Frank Pinchot, had chosen that date to get married, so they would choose another date. In February 1968, it was announced they would marry in Los Angeles on March 21. Van and Joyce were finally married in Las Vegas on May 1, 1968. One week later, Van filed for an annulment citing "fraud" and non-consummation, and that the actress "told him she wanted to have children but this was only to induce him into marriage". An article states that Bobby said that Elaine felt "so unhappy and insecure, it's the only thing to do." A preliminary divorce was filed in 1968 for Elaine Joyce and Bobby Van; Joyce is listed as Elaine J Pinchot, year of birth 1945. The divorce was never finalized, and the couple remained married until Van's death in 1980. Their daughter, Taylor, was born in 1976.

Illness and death
In February 1980, as recalled by his wife in December 1981, Van began having headaches that continued for two weeks. On going to the hospital, an angiogram was done and his doctors were not optimistic, finding the pressure in his head was due to a malignant brain tumor. Van chose to hide his illness and continued to work as long as possible, including as host of that year's Mrs. America Pageant. He later lost control of his left side and was in a wheelchair. After a five-and-a-half-month battle with cancer, Van died in Los Angeles on July 31, 1980. He is interred at Mount Sinai Memorial Park Cemetery, a Jewish cemetery in Los Angeles. In a December 1981 interview, Joyce said, "Bobby and I would have been married forever. There was no question about it".

The Vans' daughter Taylor attended Harvard-Westlake School in Los Angeles, where she met future husband Evan Meyer; they were married in October 2003, at which time she was employed as a television executive assistant for Paramount Pictures.

Filmography

Stage work
 Alive and Kicking (1950)
 On Your Toes (1954)
 Oklahoma! (1959)
 Pal Joey (1961)
 The Tunnel of Love (1963) (Westchester County Playhouse, Dobbs Ferry, NY) 
 No, No, Nanette (1971–73)
 Doctor Jazz (1975)
 The Music Man (1977) (Marriott's Lincolnshire Theatre, Lincolnshire, IL)
 Anything Goes (1977) (Kenley Players, Ohio)
 Damn Yankees (1979) (San Jose Civic Light Opera, California)

References

External links

 
 
 

1928 births
1980 deaths
American male dancers
American male musical theatre actors
American male film actors
20th-century American male actors
American game show hosts
Metro-Goldwyn-Mayer contract players
Burials at Mount Sinai Memorial Park Cemetery
Deaths from cancer in California
Deaths from brain cancer in the United States
Jewish American male actors
People from the Bronx
Male actors from New York City
20th-century American singers
California Democrats
New York (state) Democrats
20th-century American dancers
20th-century American male singers
20th-century American Jews